Roland de Marigny (born 17 November 1975) is an Italian rugby union footballer. His normal position is fullback though he can also play centre or fly-half.

Personal life

Marigny was born in Durban, South Africa. His parents originated from Mauritius.

He developed his rugby skills whilst at Westville Boys' High School, a school known for producing rugby talent such as former Springbok Tim Cocks and Shaun Payne.

Playing career

He went on to play in Wales with Bangor and Llanelli and Super 12 with the Blue Bulls and Sharks. He moved to Italy originally to play for Overmach Parma for the 2000–2001 season. Roland joined Leeds Tykes for the 2005–2006 season.
 
Roland opted to play international rugby union for Italy, qualifying for them after playing there for more than five years in the domestic league. He made his Azzurri debut as a replacement in the 2004 Six Nations against the then newly crowned World Champions England. He followed this up in the following week when he made his first start against France in Paris and was part of the side which beat Scotland in Rome that season. Roland scored Italy's last gasp try that ultimately denied Ireland their first 6 Nations triumph.

His brother Marc de Marigny is a South Africa national rugby union team sevens player and has previously captained the SA sevens side.

References

External links
RBS 6 Nations profile

1975 births
Living people
Italian rugby union players
Rugby union centres
Rugby union fly-halves
Rugby union fullbacks
Leeds Tykes players
Rugby Calvisano players
Italy international rugby union players
White South African people
South African emigrants to Italy
Italian people of French descent
Italian people of Mauritian descent
Italian sportspeople of African descent
South African people of French descent
South African people of Mauritian descent